Chaim Holder (born 17 May 1994) is a Barbadian cricketer. He made his first-class debut for the Leeward Islands in the 2017–18 Regional Four Day Competition on 4 January 2018.

References

External links
 

1994 births
Living people
Barbadian cricketers
Leeward Islands cricketers
Place of birth missing (living people)